The 1906 Home Nations Championship was the twenty-fourth series of the rugby union Home Nations Championship. Six matches were played between 13 January and 17 March. It was contested by England, Ireland, Scotland and Wales.

The 1906 Championship was little more than a footnote to the 1906 season, overshadowed by the excitement and excellence of the Original All Blacks, who had almost completed an "invincible" tour of the British Isles. This was to be followed in late 1906 by the first Springbok tour. The South Africans lacked the tactical finesse of the New Zealand team but they brought new standards of fitness, physique and blistering running pace.

The 1906 season is normally classified as a draw, but technically is given to Ireland as they scored the highest in-game points, despite a worse points difference than Wales.

Although not officially part of the tournament until 1910, a match was arranged with the French national team which was played during the Championship against England. This was the first encounter between France and England.

Table

Results

Additional matches outside the Championship

Scoring system
The matches for this season were decided on points scored. A try was worth three points, while converting a kicked goal from the try gave an additional two points. A dropped goal was worth four points, while a goal from mark was reduced from  four to three points this season. Penalty goals were worth three points.

The matches

England vs. Wales

England John Jackett (Leicester), Alfred Hind (Leicester), John Raphael (OMT), HE Shewring (Bristol), A Hudson (Gloucester), DR Gent (Gloucester), RA Jago (Devonport Albion), GEB Dobbs (Devonport Albion), HA Hodges (Nottingham), SH Osborne (Harlequins), TS Kelly (Exeter), AL Kewney (Rockcliff), EW Roberts (RNEC Keyham), Vincent Cartwright (Blackheath) capt., CEL Hammond (Harlequins)

Wales Bert Winfield (Cardiff), Teddy Morgan (London Welsh), Gwyn Nicholls (Cardiff), Rhys Gabe (Cardiff), Hopkin Maddock (London Welsh), Percy Bush (Cardiff), Dicky Owen (Swansea), Cliff Pritchard (Pontypool), Jehoida Hodges (Newport), George Travers (Pill Harriers) capt., Charlie Pritchard (Newport), Arthur Harding (London Welsh), David Jones (Treherbert), Harry Vaughan Watkins (Llanelli), Will Joseph (Swansea)

Wales vs. Scotland

Wales Bert Winfield (Cardiff), Teddy Morgan (London Welsh), Gwyn Nicholls (Cardiff), Cliff Pritchard (Pontypool), Hopkin Maddock (London Welsh), Reggie Gibbs (Cardiff), Dicky Owen (Swansea), Billy Trew (Swansea), Jehoida Hodges (Newport), George Travers (Pill Harriers) capt., Charlie Pritchard (Newport), Arthur Harding (London Welsh), David Jones (Treherbert), Jack Williams (London Welsh), Will Joseph (Swansea)

Scotland JG Scoular (Cambridge University), T Sloan (Glasgow Acads), WC Church (Glasgow Acads), KG MacLeod (Cambridge University), ABHL Purves (London Scottish), Patrick Munro (Oxford Uni), ED Simson (Edinburgh University), L West (Hartlepool Rovers) capt., AG Cairns (Watsonians), WE Kyle (Hawick), JC MacCallum (Watsonians), WL Russell  (Glasgow Acads), WP Scott (West of Scotland), Bedell-Sivright (Edinburgh University), HG Monteith (Cambridge University)

England vs. Ireland

England John Jackett (Leicester), JE Hutchinson (Durham City), JRP Sandford (Marlborough Nomads), CH Milton (Camborne School of Mines), A Hudson (Gloucester), DR Gent (Gloucester), RA Jago (Devonport Albion), GEB Dobbs (Devonport Albion), HA Hodges (Nottingham), WA Mills (Devonport Albion), TS Kelly (Exeter), AL Kewney (Rockcliff), EW Roberts (RNEC Keyham), Vincent Cartwright (Blackheath) capt., CEL Hammond (Harlequins)

Ireland GJ Henebrey (Garryowen), F Casement (Dublin University), HJ Anderson (Old Wesley), James Cecil Parke (Dublin University), HB Thrift (Dublin University), William Purdon (Queen's University, Belfast), ED Caddell (Dublin University), Basil Maclear (Monkstown), M White (Queens's College, Cork), CE Allen (Derry) capt., Alfred Tedford (Malone), HG Wilson (Malone), HJ Knox (Dublin University), JJ Coffey (Lansdowne), F Gardiner (NIFC)

Ireland vs. Scotland

Ireland GJ Henebrey (Garryowen), F Casement (Dublin University), HJ Anderson (Old Wesley), James Cecil Parke (Dublin University), CG Robb (Queen's University, Belfast), William Purdon (Queen's University, Belfast), ED Caddell (Dublin University), Basil Maclear (Monkstown), M White (Queens's College, Cork), CE Allen (Derry) capt., Alfred Tedford (Malone), HG Wilson (Malone), HJ Knox (Dublin University), JJ Coffey (Lansdowne), F Gardiner (NIFC)

Scotland JG Scoular (Cambridge University), MW Walter (London Scottish), JL Forbes (Watsonians), KG MacLeod (Cambridge University), ABHL Purves (London Scottish), Patrick Munro (Oxford Uni), ED Simson (Edinburgh University), L West (Hartlepool Rovers) capt., AG Cairns (Watsonians), WE Kyle (Hawick), JC MacCallum (Watsonians), WL Russell  (Glasgow Acads), WP Scott (West of Scotland), Bedell-Sivright (Edinburgh University), HG Monteith (Cambridge University)

Ireland vs. Wales

Ireland GJ Henebrey (Garryowen), F Casement (Dublin University), Basil Maclear (Monkstown), James Cecil Parke (Dublin University), HB Thrift (Dublin University), William Purdon (Queen's University, Belfast), ED Caddell (Dublin University), Jos Wallace (Wanderers), M White (Queens's College, Cork), CE Allen (Derry) capt., Alfred Tedford (Malone), HG Wilson (Malone), HJ Knox (Dublin University), JJ Coffey (Lansdowne), F Gardiner (NIFC)

Wales Bert Winfield (Cardiff), Teddy Morgan (London Welsh), Gwyn Nicholls (Cardiff), Rhys Gabe (Cardiff), Hopkin Maddock (London Welsh), Reggie Gibbs (Cardiff), Dicky Owen (Swansea), Jack Powell (Cardiff), Jehoida Hodges (Newport), George Travers (Pill Harriers) capt., Charlie Pritchard (Newport), Arthur Harding (London Welsh), Dai Westacott (Cardiff), Tom Evans (Llanelli), Will Joseph (Swansea)

Scotland vs. England

Scotland JG Scoular (Cambridge University), MW Walter (London Scottish), JL Forbes (Watsonians), KG MacLeod (Cambridge University), ABHL Purves (London Scottish), Patrick Munro (Oxford Uni), ED Simson (Edinburgh University), L West (Hartlepool Rovers) capt., AG Cairns (Watsonians), WE Kyle (Hawick), JC MacCallum (Watsonians), WL Russell  (Glasgow Acads), WP Scott (West of Scotland), Bedell-Sivright (Edinburgh University), HG Monteith (Cambridge University)

England John Jackett (Leicester), T Simpson (Rockcliff), JGG Birkett (Harlequins), JE Raphael (OMT), HE Shewring (Bristol), J Peters (Plymouth), AD Stoop (Harlequins), CH Shaw (Moseley), Robert Dibble (Bridgwater & Albion), J Green (Skipton), TS Kelly (Exeter), AL Kewney (Rockcliff), WA Mills (Devonport Albion), Vincent Cartwright (Blackheath) capt., CEL Hammond (Harlequins)

French matches

France vs. England

France WH Crichton (Le Havre), E Lesieur (Stade Français), P Maclos (Stade Français), EW Lewis (Le Havre), G Lane (Racing Club de France) capt., A Hubert (Association Sportive Français), T Varvier (Racing Club de France), A Verges (Stade Français), Maurin (Association Sportive Français), A Branlat (Racing Club de France), G Jerome (Stade Français), AH Muhr (Racing Club de France), M Communeau (Stade Français), P Gauderman (Racing Club de France), J Dufourcq (Stade Bordelais Universitaire)

England John Jackett (Leicester), John Raphael (OMT), JGG Birkett (Harlequins), A Hudson (Gloucester), HE Shewring (Bristol), J Peters (Plymouth), AD Stoop (Harlequins), TB Hogarth (Hartlepool Rovers), Vincent Cartwright  (Nottingham) capt., J Green (Skipton), TS Kelly (Exeter), CEL Hammond (Harlequins), WA Mills (Devonport Albion), Robert Dibble (Bridgwater & Albion), AL Kewney (Rockcliff)

External links

Bibliography
 
 

1905-06
1905–06 in British rugby union
1905–06 in English rugby union
rugby union
rugby union
Home Nations Championship
Home Nations Championship
Home Nations Championship
1905–06 in Scottish rugby union